The 2009 World Jiu-Jitsu Championship, commonly known as the 2009 Mundials or 2009 Worlds, was an international jiu-jitsu event organised by the International Brazilian Jiu-Jitsu Federation (IBJFF) and held at California State University in Long Beach, California, USA, on March 27, 28 and 29, 2009.

Teams results 
Results by Academy

References

World Jiu-Jitsu Championship